This is a summary of 1977 in music in the United Kingdom, including the official charts from that year.

Events
1 January – The Clash headline the gala opening of the London music club, The Roxy.
6 January – Record company EMI drops the controversial punk rock group the Sex Pistols.
22 January – Maria Kliegel makes her London début at the Wigmore Hall, with a programme of Bach, Kodály, and Franck.
26 January - Fleetwood Mac's original lead guitarist, Peter Green, is committed to a mental hospital in England after firing a pistol at a delivery boy bringing him a royalties check.
27 January – After releasing only one single for the band, EMI Records terminates its contract with the Sex Pistols.
4 February - Fleetwood Mac's Rumours is released; it goes on to become one of the best-selling albums of all time.
15 February – Sid Vicious replaces Glen Matlock as the bassist of the Sex Pistols.
10 March – A&M Records signs the Sex Pistols in a ceremony in front of Buckingham Palace.  The contract is terminated on 16 March as a result of the band vandalizing property and verbally abusing employees during a visit to the record company's office.
2 May – Elton John performs the first of six consecutive nights at London's Rainbow Theatre, his first concert in eight months. John keeps a low profile in 1977, not releasing any new music for the first year since his recording career began eight years previously.
7 May – Having been postponed from 2 April because of a BBC technicians' strike, the 22nd Eurovision Song Contest finally goes ahead in London's Wembley Conference Centre.
11 May – The Stranglers and support band London start a 10-week national tour.
12 May - Virgin Records announces that they have signed the Sex Pistols.
7 June – The Sex Pistols attempt to interrupt Silver Jubilee celebrations for Queen Elizabeth II by performing "God Save the Queen" from a boat on the River Thames. Police force the boat to dock and several arrests are made following a scuffle.
12 June - Guitarist Michael Schenker vanishes after a UFO concert at The Roundhouse in London. He is replaced for several months by Paul Chapman until he appears again to rejoin the group in October.
15 June – The Snape Maltings Training Orchestra makes its London debut at St John's, Smith Square.
25 June – The Young Musicians' Symphony Orchestra of London, conducted by James Blair, gives the belated première of William Walton's 1962 composition Prelude for Orchestra.
6 July - During a Pink Floyd concert before a crowd of 80,000 at Olympic Stadium in Montreal, Bassist Roger Waters having become increasingly irritated by a fan until he exerts his frustration by spitting on him. The incident becomes the catalyst for the group's next album, The Wall.
22 July – The first night of The Proms is broadcast by BBC Radio 3 for the first time in quadraphonic sound.
26 July – Led Zeppelin cancels the last seven dates of their American tour after lead singer Robert Plant learns that his six-year-old son Karac has died of a respiratory virus. The show two days before in Oakland proves to be the band's last ever in the United States.
1 September – World première at the Royal Albert Hall in London of the expanded version of Luciano Berio's Coro.
16 September – T.Rex frontman Marc Bolan is killed in an automobile accident.
27 October - The Sex Pistols release their controversial album Never Mind the Bollocks, Here's the Sex Pistols, which would be their only studio album.

Charts

Number-one singles

Number-one albums

Year-end charts
1977 is the first year for which "full year" UK year-end charts exist – in order to be published in the year's final issue of Music Week and to be broadcast on BBC Radio 1 on New Year's Day, the collection of sales data had a cut-off point sometime in early December each year. This continued to be the case until 1983, when Gallup took over the compilation of the charts from the British Market Research Bureau (BMRB) and automated the data collection process, which meant that sales could be tabulated right up until the end of the year and still produced in time for the Radio 1 broadcast. However, from 1977 to 1982 (with the exception of 1979), BMRB produced updated charts a few months later which included the missing final weeks' sales for each year.

The tables below include sales between 1 January and 30 December 1977: the year-end charts reproduced in the issue of Music Week dated 24 December 1977 and played on Radio 1 on 1 January 1978 only include sales figures up until 10 December 1977.

Best-selling singles

 Despite spending four weeks at number one, Rod Stewart's "I Don't Want to Talk About It"/"The First Cut Is the Deepest" was only placed at number 33 on the year-end chart for 1977, the lowest ranked number one single of the year, and lower than another of Stewart's singles, "You're in My Heart", which only reached number three. Some chart-watchers claim to have evidence that an incorrect panel sale figure was applied to sales during the period that "I Don't Want to Talk About It"/"The First Cut Is the Deepest" was out, resulting in a lower estimation of the single's total sales, and that the single should actually be placed inside the top fifteen year-end positions. However, this claim has never been verified by BMRB or any of the subsequent chart compilers.

Best-selling albums
The list of the top fifty best-selling albums of 1977 were published in the third edition of the BPI Year Book in 1978. However, in 2007 the Official Charts Company published album chart histories for each year from 1956 to 1977, researched by historian Sharon Mawer, and included an updated list of the top ten best-selling albums for each year based on the new research. The updated top ten for 1977 is shown in the table below.

Notes:

Classical music: new works
Malcolm Arnold - Variations on a Theme of Ruth Gipps for Orchestra, Op. 122
John Buller – Proença for mezzo-soprano, electric guitar, and large orchestra 
Peter Maxwell Davies - A Mirror of Whitening Light, for chamber orchestra
Brian Ferneyhough – Time and Motion Study I, for bass clarinet
Alun Hoddinott - Sinfonia Fidei
Michael Tippett - Symphony No. 4

Opera
William Alwyn - Miss Julie
Peter Maxwell Davies – The Martyrdom of St Magnus (premièred 18 June at St Magnus Cathedral, Kirkwall)
Thea Musgrave – Mary, Queen of Scots
Michael Tippett – The Ice Break (premièred 7 July at the Royal Opera House, Covent Garden)

Film and Incidental music
John Addison - A Bridge Too Far directed by Richard Attenborough.
Richard Rodney Bennett - Equus, starring Richard Burton.

Births
4 January - Tim Wheeler (Ash)
18 January – Richard Archer, singer (Hard-Fi)
25 January - Christian Ingebrigtsen, Norwegian-born singer (A1)
2 March - Chris Martin, singer and songwriter (Coldplay)
3 March - Ronan Keating, Irish singer (Boyzone)
7 March – Paul Cattermole, singer (S Club 7)
10 March
Colin Murray, DJ
Rita Simons, singer (Girls@Play) and actress
18 March - Nick Grant, singer (Ultimate Kaos)
21 March - Lee Missen, singer (Code Red)
26 April - Celena Cherry, singer (Honeyz)
4 May - Carrie Askew, singer (Shampoo)
31 May - Joel Ross, DJ
30 July – Ian Watkins, singer (Lostprophets)
17 August - Claire Richards, singer (Steps)
4 September - Lucie Silvas, singer
11 September - Jon Buckland (Coldplay)
27 October - Mariama Goodman, singer (Solid HarmoniE, Honeyz)
1 November - Alistair Griffin, singer/songwriter
4 November - Kavana, singer
7 December – Dominic Howard, drummer (Muse)

Deaths
10 February - Grace Williams, composer, 70
26 March - Madeleine Dring, composer and actress, 53 (cerebral haemorrhage)
21 April - Issy Bonn, English actor, comedian, and singer, 74
22 April - Ryan Davies, comedian, singer and songwriter, 40 (asthma)
13 June – Matthew Garber, former child star of Mary Poppins, 21 (pancreatitis)
16 September - Marc Bolan, 29, singer-songwriter (car crash)
11 October - Joseph Wheeler, musicologist, 49/50
14 November - Richard Addinsell, Warsaw Concerto composer, 73
24 December - Raymond Sunderland, organist and composer, 56
25 December - Charlie Chaplin, actor and composer, 88
date unknown
Jimmy Cooper, hammered dulcimer player, 69/70
Charles Turner, composer and spy

Music awards

BRIT Awards
The 1977 BRIT Awards were to mark the Queen's Silver Jubilee and were for the previous 25 years of her reign. The winners were:

Best British non-musical record: Richard Burton and cast Under Milk Wood
Best British producer: George Martin
Best classical soloist album: Jacqueline du Pré - Elgar, Cello Concerto
Best international album: Simon & Garfunkel - Bridge Over Troubled Water
Best orchestral album: Benjamin Britten - War Requiem
British album: The Beatles – Sgt. Pepper's Lonely Hearts Club Band
British breakthrough act: Julie Covington
British female solo artist: Shirley Bassey
British group: The Beatles
British male solo artist: Cliff Richard
British single: Queen - "Bohemian Rhapsody" & Procol Harum - "A Whiter Shade of Pale"  (Joint Winners)
Outstanding Contribution: L.G. Wood and The Beatles (Joint Winners)

See also 
 1977 in British radio
 1977 in British television
 1977 in the United Kingdom
 List of British films of 1977

References

External links
BBC Radio 1's Chart Show
The Official Charts Company

 
British
British music by year